Merlin is the eighth studio album by Dutch band Kayak. The first half of the original LP (tracks 1 through 5) is a concept fantasy story about Merlin the Magician. The second half of the LP is a collection of individual songs.

In 2003, Kayak released a re-worked and longer version of the Merlin-story, under the title Merlin - Bard of the Unseen.

Track listing 

 "Merlin" - 7:23
 "Tintagel" - 2:41
 "The Sword In The Stone" - 3:31
 "The King's Enchanter" - 2:42
 "Niniane (Lady Of The Lake) - 7:22
 "Seagull" - 4:10
 "Boogie Heart" - 4:11
 "Now That We've Come This Far" - 4:29
 "Can't Afford To Lose" - 3:19
 "Love's Aglow" - 6:03

All songs composed by Ton Scherpenzeel, lyrics by Ton Scherpenzeel and Irene Linders

Lineup
Edward Reekers - lead (all but 10) and backing vocals
Johan Slager - electric and acoustic guitars, banjo, flute
Ton Scherpenzeel - keyboards, backing and lead (10) vocals
Peter Scherpenzeel - bass guitar, recorder
Max Werner - drums, percussion, backing vocals
Irene Linders - backing vocals
Katherine Lapthorn - backing vocals

Guest musicians

Rein v/d Broek - Brass instruments

Benny Behr c.s. - Strings

References

External links
Official site

1981 albums
Kayak (band) albums
Works based on Merlin